Zoran Lazarević (born 23 October 1947) is a Serbian former professional basketball player.

Playing career 
Lazarević was a member of Pirot until 1968 where he played with Svetislav Pešić.

Lazarević played for a Belgrade-based team Crvena zvezda of the Yugoslav First League from 1968 to 1975. His teammates were Zoran Slavnić, Dragan Kapičić, Ljubodrag Simonović, Dragiša Vučinić, and Goran Rakočević among others. With them, he won a FIBA European Cup Winners' Cup in 1974, two National Championships, and three National Cups.

Career achievements 
 FIBA European Cup Winners' Cup winner: 1 (with Crvena zvezda: 1973–74).
 Yugoslav League champion: 2 (with Crvena zvezda: 1968–69, 1971–72).
 Yugoslav Cup winner: 3 (with Crvena zvezda: 1970–71, 1972–73, 1974–75).

See also 
 List of KK Crvena zvezda players with 100 games played

References

1947 births
Living people
KK Crvena zvezda players
KK Pirot players
Power forwards (basketball)
Serbian men's basketball players
Yugoslav men's basketball players